John East Hawley (born 8 May 1954) is an English former professional footballer and coach, who played as a forward. Hawley played for several English clubs: Hull City, Leeds United, Arsenal, Sunderland, Leyton Orient, Bradford City, and Scunthorpe United. He also played for NASL's St. Louis Stars.

At the end of his playing days, Hawley went on to work as a coach in the academy of Nottingham Forest.

Career
Born in Patrington, East Riding of Yorkshire, Hawley first played as a professional footballer in 1972, for Hull City. He was loaned for the 1975–76 season to the St. Louis Stars, rejoining Hull at that season's end.
In 1978, Hawley made the switch for £81,000 to local rivals, Leeds United. Hawley was the Whites' top scorer, scoring 16 goals in 33 appearances. He left in the summer of 1979 for Sunderland, for £200,000.

In 1981, he moved to  Arsenal for £51,000, where he would make 23 appearances, scoring three times. Whilst on Arsenal's books, Hawley would be loaned to Leyton Orient and Hull City. He left Arsenal in 1983 for Valley Parade,  where he helped Bradford City win the Third Division title of 1985. He left Bradford to join Scunthorpe United, with whom he brought his career to a conclusion.

After he retired, Hawley firstly worked in his family's antique business, and then as a coach within the Nottingham Forest academy.

Personal life
While playing for Bradford City, he was involved with rescue efforts during the Bradford City stadium fire. He has been credited with saving the life of a supporter by pulling him to safety. As of 2014 he was running an auctioneering business in East Yorkshire.

Honours
Bradford City
Football League Third Division: 1985

References

1954 births
Living people
People from Patrington
Footballers from the East Riding of Yorkshire
English footballers
Association football forwards
Hull City A.F.C. players
Leeds United F.C. players
Sunderland A.F.C. players
Arsenal F.C. players
Leyton Orient F.C. players
Bradford City A.F.C. players
Scunthorpe United F.C. players
English Football League players
English expatriate footballers
English expatriate sportspeople in the United States
Expatriate soccer players in the United States
St. Louis Stars (soccer) players
North American Soccer League (1968–1984) players